Sébastien Gervais (born December 2, 1976 in Bordeaux) is a French professional footballer who last played in the Championnat de France amateur for RCO Agde.

He played on the professional level in Ligue 2 for Nîmes Olympique and FC Sète.

References

1976 births
Living people
French footballers
Ligue 2 players
Nîmes Olympique players
FC Sète 34 players
RCO Agde players
FC Villefranche Beaujolais players
Association football midfielders